Sheheryar Munawar Siddiqui (born 9 August 1988) is a Pakistani actor, film producer, director and television host. He made his film debut as a lead actor and producer in 2016 with Ho Mann Jahaan. He is notable for his role in Asim Raza's Parey Hut Love, which became Pakistan's highest grossing movie in the year 2019. He has also starred in male-centric serials such as Tanhaiyan Naye Silsilay, Kahi Un Kahi, Zindagi Gulzar Hai and Aasmanon Pay Likha and Meray Dard Ko Jo Zuban Miley. For his performances in Ho Mann Jahaan, Saat Din Mohabbat In, and Parey Hut Love, he has won a Lux Style Award (2017); a Masala Award (2019); and a Pakistan International Screen Award (2020), respectively.

Personal life 
He was born on 9 August 1988 in Karachi.

His father, air commodore (r) Munawar Alam Siddiqui, was in the Pakistan Air Force before switching to business after retirement, his sister Nadia is a business graduate, while his elder brother, Asfandyar, who died in a car accident on 23 December 2012, was an investment banker. His younger brother, Manoucheher, was wounded in a cafe shooting in 2011.

In a 2018 interview with Samina Peerzada, he revealed that he's of Sindhi descent from his paternal side and Brahui maternally, while the influential TV director and producer Sultana Siddiqui is his aunt. Sheheryar's father, Munawar, is also a board member of Hum Network, founded by Sultana.

Another of his uncles is Mazhar ul Haq Siddiqui, "one of Pakistan's senior most civil servants and an eminent educationist", who also served as the vice-chancellor of Sindh University and is a board member of Hum Network as well.

Ali Jehangir Siddiqui, an entrepreneur who also served as ambassador of Pakistan to the United States for few months in 2018, is his cousin. Ali's father, Jahangir Siddiqui, is the founder of JS Group.

Education 
Sheheryar completed his Bachelors in Finance from Institute of Business Administration, Karachi.

Career

Acting 
Sheheryar started his career as an actor with his debut in the Hum TV's drama serial Meray Dard Ko Jo Zuban Miley in which he played the character of a deaf and dumb boy. 

In 2013, he appeared in Tanhaiyan Naye Silsilay, Kahi Unkahi and Zindagi Gulzar Hai. 

For the next years he'll concentrate on movies.

In 2021, he starred in Pehli Si Muhabbat, his first TV role since Aasmanon Pay Likha in 2014, with Maya Ali in their second collaboration after the 2019 movie Parey Hut Love.

Direction 
In 2015, he was Asim Raza's assistant director during an advertisement campaign for QMobile.

In 2021, he became a director with the short film Prince Charming, about post-marriage depression, which was well received.

Hosting
In 2022, he began hosting a TV gameshow called Khel Kay Jeet on Express TV.

Filmography

Film

Television

Web

Awards and nominations

Lux Style Awards

References

External links
 
 
 Gup Shup With Sheheryar Munawar - Fuchsia Magazine

Pakistani male television actors
Pakistani male film actors
Pakistani film producers
Pakistani television hosts
1990 births
Living people
Sindhi people
Brahui people
Male actors from Karachi
Institute of Business Administration, Karachi alumni